Amata chroma is a species of moth of the family Erebidae first described by Charles Swinhoe in 1892. It is found in Australia.

References 

chroma
Moths described in 1892
Moths of Australia